Mouldi Manai (born 2 April 1950) is a Tunisian boxer. He competed in the men's featherweight event at the 1968 Summer Olympics.

References

1950 births
Living people
Tunisian male boxers
Olympic boxers of Tunisia
Boxers at the 1968 Summer Olympics
Mediterranean Games silver medalists for Tunisia
Mediterranean Games medalists in boxing
Competitors at the 1971 Mediterranean Games
Featherweight boxers
20th-century Tunisian people